The 2022 Viaplay Dutch Darts Masters was the first staging of the tournament by the Professional Darts Corporation, and the third entry in the 2022 World Series of Darts. The tournament featured 16 players (eight PDC players and eight Dutch qualifiers) and was held at the Ziggo Dome in Amsterdam, Netherlands on 24–25 June 2022.

Dimitri Van den Bergh won his second consecutive World Series title after defeating Dirk van Duijvenbode 8–2 in the final.

Prize money
The total prize fund was £60,000.

Qualifiers
On the announcement of the tournament on 11 April, the PDC confirmed the 8 players who would be their 'elite' representatives at the event, including Fallon Sherrock, who was denied her chance to appear on the 2020 World Series of Darts circuit, owing to the COVID-19 pandemic.

The seedings were based on the results from previous World Series events held earlier in the year.

  (first round)
  (champion)
  (first round)
  (semi-finals)
  (first round)
  (first round)
  (first round)
  (first round)

The Dutch qualifiers consisted of the eight PDC Tour Card holders who were the highest ranked on the PDC Order of Merit on 31 May 2022:
  (semi-finals)
  (runner-up)
  (quarter-finals)
  (quarter-finals)
  (quarter-finals)
  (first round)
  (quarter-finals)
  (first round)

Draw
The draw was made on 23 June by Rod Harrington.

References

Dutch Darts Masters
Dutch Darts Masters
World Series of Darts
Sports competitions in Amsterdam
Dutch Darts Masters